Schwantes is a surname. Notable people with the surname include:

 Athos Schwantes (born 1985), Brazilian fencer
 Marlon Schwantes (born 1984), Brazilian footballer
 Martin Heinrich Gustav Schwantes (1891–1960), German archaeologist and botanist
 Will Schwantes  (born 2004),
Inde-Pop Multi Instrumentalist and Vocalist  

German-language surnames